House of Dolls is a 1953 novella by Ka-tzetnik 135633. The novella describes "Joy Divisions", which were groups of Jewish women in the concentration camps during World War II who were kept for the sexual pleasure of Nazi soldiers.

Origins 

Between 1942 and 1945, Auschwitz and nine other Nazi concentration camps contained camp brothels (Freudenabteilungen "Joy Divisions"), mainly used to reward cooperative non-Jewish inmates.
In the documentary film Memory of the Camps, a project supervised by the British Ministry of Information and the American Office of War Information during the summer of 1945, camera crews filmed women who had been forced into sexual slavery for the use of guards and favoured prisoners. The film-makers stated that as the women died they were replaced by women from the concentration camp Ravensbrück.

Literature and scholarly references
In his essay "Narrative Perspectives on Holocaust Literature", Leon Yudkin uses House of Dolls as one of his key examples of the ways in which authors have approached the Holocaust, using the work as an example of "diaries (testimonies) that look like novels" due to its reliance on its author's own experiences.

Ronit Lentin discusses House of Dolls in her work Israel and the Daughters of the Shoah. In her book Lentin interviews a child of Holocaust survivors, who recalls House of Dolls as one of her first exposures to the Holocaust.  Lentin notes that the "explicit, painful" story made a huge impact when published and states that "many children of holocaust survivors who write would agree . . . that House of Dolls represents violence and sexuality in a manner which borders on the pornographic".

Na'ama Shik, researching at Yad Vashem, the principal Jewish organization for the remembrance of the victims of the Holocaust, considers the book as fiction. Nonetheless it is part of the Israeli high school curriculum.

The success of the book showed there was a market for Nazi exploitation popular literature, known in Israel as Stalags. However Yechiel Szeintuch from the Hebrew University rejects links between the smutty Stalags on the one hand, and Ka-Tzetnik's works, which he insists were based on reality, on the other.

In popular culture
Joy Division was a British post-punk band from 1976 to 1980, who took their name from the reference in this book. One of their early songs, "No Love Lost", contains a short excerpt from the novella.

Love Camp 7 (1968), considered to be the first Nazi exploitation film, is set in a concentration camp "Joy Division".

See also

 Comfort women
 German camp brothels in World War II
 German military brothels in World War II
 German war crimes
 Japanese war crimes
 Rape during the occupation of Germany
 Recreation and Amusement Association
 Sexual slavery

References

Further reading
 Ka-tzetnik 135633. The House of Dolls. .
 Wyden, Peter. Stella: One Woman's True Tale of Evil, Betrayal, and Survival in Hitler's Germany. .

External links
 Full text in English at Archive.org

1953 novels
20th-century Israeli novels
Holocaust literature
Wartime sexual violence in World War II
Novels about prostitution
Works about prostitution in Germany
Nazi exploitation